Sir James William Olive KBE (1856 – 14 January 1942) was Assistant Commissioner "A" of the London Metropolitan Police from 1920 to 1925. As such, he was in charge of administration and uniformed operations and was the Commissioner's deputy. From 1922, he became the first officer formally to be granted the title of Deputy Commissioner.

Olive joined the Metropolitan Police as a Constable in September 1872. He was initially posted to "A" Division in Whitehall, but later transferred to Scotland Yard as an administrative officer. He was promoted to Sergeant in January 1877, Inspector in July 1886, Sub-Divisional Inspector in December 1890, and Chief Inspector in June 1893. In May 1903, he was promoted to Superintendent and took command of Thames Division, responsible for patrolling the River Thames. In 1905, after reorganising the whole way in which the river was policed, he was transferred to the command of "X" Division (Kilburn). In October 1918, he was promoted to Chief Constable in charge of the North-Western District, becoming the first former Constable to be promoted past the rank of Superintendent in the Uniform Branch. He was appointed Commander of the Order of the British Empire (CBE) in March 1920, having already been appointed Member of the Order of the British Empire (MBE).

In April 1920, Olive was appointed Assistant Commissioner "A". On 1 December 1922, he became the first officer to be appointed Deputy Commissioner, although this was only a courtesy title and he also remained Assistant Commissioner "A". He was appointed Knight Commander of the Order of the British Empire (KBE) in June 1924. He retired on 31 December 1925 after 53 years' service (which may well make him the longest-serving officer in Metropolitan Police history), and died at his home in Kilburn in 1942.

A month after he joined the police, Olive was (as a musician) a founder member of the Police Minstrels, who put on entertainments at police stations. He later became their president.

References
Obituary, The Times, 15 January 1941
Martin Fido & Keith Skinner, The Official Encyclopedia of Scotland Yard, Virgin Books, London: 1999

External links
  Metropolitan Police Minstrels

Assistant Commissioners of Police of the Metropolis
Deputy Commissioners of Police of the Metropolis
1856 births
1942 deaths
Knights Commander of the Order of the British Empire